Symphimus is a genus of snakes in the family Colubridae. The genus is endemic to Mexico and Central America.

Species and geographic ranges
The following two species are recognized as being valid.
Symphimus leucostomus  – southeastern Mexico (Chiapas, Jalisco, Oaxaca)
Symphimus mayae  – northern Belize, Guatemala, Mexico (Campeche, Quintana Roo, Yucatán)

Etymology
The specific name, mayae, is in honor of the Maya of the Yucatán Peninsula.

Reproduction
Snakes of the genus Symphimus are oviparous.

References

Further reading
Boulenger GA (1896). Catalogue of the Snakes in the British Museum. Volume III., Containing the Colubridæ (Opisthoglyphæ and Proteroglyphæ) ... London: Trustees of the British Museum (Natural History). (Taylor and Francis, printers). xiv + 727 pp. + Plates I-XXV. (Genus Symphimus, p. 642).
Cope ED (1869). "Seventh Contribution to the Herpetology of Tropical America". Proceedings of the American Philosophical Society 11: 147–192. (Symphimus, new genus, and Symphimus leucostomus, new species, p. 150).
Gaige H (1936). "Some Reptiles and Amphibians from Yucatan and Campeche, Mexico". Carnegie Institution of Washington Publications (457): 289–304. (Eurypholis mayae, new species, p. 300).
Heimes, Peter (2016). Snakes of Mexico: Herpetofauna Mexicana Vol. I. Frankfurt, Germany: Chimaira. 572 pp. .

Symphimus
Snake genera